Loreta Asanavičiūtė (22 April 1967 – 13 January 1991) was a Lithuanian seamstress who was killed in the January Events, a series of violent confrontations that took place near the Vilnius TV Tower in January 1991.

She was the only female among the 13 people who died in the events at the television tower. She was run over by a Soviet tank and died later in hospital.

A  road in the centre of Vilnius is named Loretos Asanavičiūtės gatvė in her memory; it was formerly named  Žvaigždžių, and renamed in 1996. A linden tree has been planted in her memory, along with oaks for her male fellow victims. She is buried in the Antakalnis Cemetery in Vilnius.

References

External links
 Detailed account of her life, death, and commemoration, with several illustrations

1967 births
1991 deaths
20th-century Lithuanian women
Tailors
Violent deaths in Lithuania